The American Brain Tumor Association (ABTA), founded in 1973, was the first and is now the only national nonprofit organization in the United States dedicated to providing support services and programs to brain tumor patients and their families, as well as the funding of brain tumor research.

The organization is headquartered in Chicago, Illinois, at 8550 W Bryn Mawr Avenue.

The group's two founders were mothers of children who died from brain tumors.

Services
The American Brain Tumor Association provides:
 A library of publications and resources covering general brain tumor information as well as tumor-specific and treatment-specific information
 Phone and email-based supportive care provided by a licensed health-care professionals.
 Funding for brain tumor research through a program that supports early career scientists and medical students, projects that transition laboratory science to actual patient treatment and care, discovery research, and data collection through the Central Brain Tumor Registry of the United States
 A website featuring tumor, treatment and support information and resources for patients, families, caregivers and health care professionals
 The Connections online support community
 TrialConnect, a free clinical trial matching service
 MyCaringLink, an online caregiver support tool
 National and regional meetings for patients and caregivers

Mission
As stated on their website: "The mission of the American Brain Tumor Association is to advance the understanding and treatment of brain tumors with the goals of improving, extending and, ultimately, saving the lives of those impacted by a brain tumor diagnosis. We do this through interactions and engagements with brain tumor patients and their families, collaborations with allied groups and organizations, and the funding of brain tumor research."

Events
The Breakthrough for Brain Tumors 5K Run & Walk is a series of annual events held to support the ABTA's patient support and research funding programs. Events are held in six cities across the United States: Chicago, New York City, New York, Tampa, Florida, Los Angeles, Spokane, Washington and Ypsilanti, Michigan.

Team Breakthrough, the ABTA's running and endurance team, participates in marathons, half-marathons and triathlons across the United States to raise money for ABTA programs.

Movie
ABTA produced an award-winning children's DVD/VHS movie titled Alex's Journey: the story of a child with a brain tumor.

References

External links
 ABTA website

Cancer organizations based in the United States
Organizations established in 1973
Non-profit organizations based in Chicago
Brain tumor
Medical and health organizations based in Illinois